Veterans Memorial High School is a public high school in unincorporated Bexar County, Texas, United States. It is operated by the Judson Independent School District, and classified as a 5A school by the UIL. The school has a San Antonio address but is not within the San Antonio city limits.

In 2017, the school was rated "Met Standard" by the Texas Education Agency, with a 1-Star Distinction for Academic Achievement in ELA/Reading.

The school was originally named after Willis Mackey, who retired in 2014 after serving seven years as the district superintendent, but the school board voted to change the name after controversy arose in the community over naming the school after him. The school’s name was changed to Veterans Memorial High School before it opened in August 2016 with 600 freshmen and sophomore students. A junior class was added for the 2017-2018 school year, and Veterans High graduated its first class of seniors in May 2019.

References 

Public high schools in Texas
High schools in Bexar County, Texas
Judson Independent School District high schools
2016 establishments in Texas